Mirebalais is a commune in the Centre department of Haiti, approximately 60 km northeast of Port-au-Prince on National Road 3. The city was established in 1702.

American Rotarians have made a number of mission-type trips to the city and surrounding areas since the 1980s. Located along the hydroelectric power transmission grid, the city normally has electricity throughout the day and night.

During the United Nations occupation of 2005, Nepalese troops were stationed in the city, using the city jail as their headquarters.

A U.S. military C-17 cargo plane carried out a large airdrop of food and supplies here in the wake of the 2010 Haiti earthquake.

Health
Mirebalais is served by the teaching hospital Hôpital Universitaire de Mirebalais, the largest solar-operated hospital in the world.

Sport
Mirebalais is home to the AS Mirebalais sports team.

Notable Mirebalaisians 
  (1877-9 March 1920) successor to Charlemagne Péralte leading the Cacos resistance to the US occupation of Haiti.
 Madame Max Adolphe (b. 1925; whereabouts unknown), a notorious torturer and leader of the Duvalier regime.

References 

Populated places in Centre (department)
Populated places established in 1703
Communes of Haiti
1703 establishments in the French colonial empire